José Guadalupe Rubio Talamantes (born March 14, 1966 in Gómez Palacio, Durango), known as José Rubio, is a Mexican football manager and former player.

External links
 

1966 births
Living people
People from Durango
Mexican football managers
Liga MX players
Mexican footballers
Association footballers not categorized by position